Yves Hervouet (30 April 1921 – 29 January 1999) was a French sinologist, specializing in classical Chinese literature. He was professor emeritus at the Paris Diderot University as well as an appointed Legion of Honour officer.

References

French sinologists
1921 births
1999 deaths
Officiers of the Légion d'honneur
People from Loire-Atlantique
Grenoble Alpes University alumni
Academic staff of the University of Bordeaux
Academic staff of the University of Paris